In mathematics, the Littlewood conjecture is an open problem in Diophantine approximation, proposed by John Edensor Littlewood around 1930. It states that for any two real numbers α and β,

where  is the distance to the nearest integer.

Formulation and explanation

This means the following: take a point (α, β) in the plane, and then consider the sequence of points

(2α, 2β), (3α, 3β), ... .

For each of these, multiply the distance to the closest line with integer x-coordinate by the distance to the closest line with integer y-coordinate. This product will certainly be at most 1/4. The conjecture makes no statement about whether this sequence of values will converge; it typically does not, in fact. The conjecture states something about the limit inferior, and says that there is a subsequence for which the distances decay faster than the reciprocal, i.e.

o(1/n)

in the little-o notation.

Connection to further conjectures

It is known that this would follow from a result in the geometry of numbers, about the minimum on a non-zero lattice point of a product of three linear forms in three real variables: the implication was shown in 1955 by Cassels and Swinnerton-Dyer. This can be formulated another way, in group-theoretic terms. There is now another conjecture, expected to hold for n ≥ 3: it is stated in terms of G = SLn(R), Γ = SLn(Z), and the subgroup D of diagonal matrices in G.

Conjecture: for any g in G/Γ such that Dg is relatively compact (in G/Γ), then Dg is closed.

This in turn is a special case of a general conjecture of Margulis on Lie groups.

Partial results
Borel showed in 1909 that the exceptional set of real pairs (α,β) violating the statement of the conjecture is of Lebesgue measure zero. Manfred Einsiedler, Anatole Katok and Elon Lindenstrauss have shown that it must have Hausdorff dimension zero; and in fact is a union of countably many compact sets of box-counting dimension zero. The result was proved by using a measure classification theorem for diagonalizable actions of higher-rank groups, and an isolation theorem proved by Lindenstrauss and Barak Weiss.

These results imply that non-trivial pairs satisfying the conjecture exist: indeed, given a real number α such that , it is possible to construct an explicit β such that (α,β) satisfies the conjecture.

See also
 Littlewood polynomial

References

Further reading
 

Diophantine approximation
Conjectures
Unsolved problems in mathematics